Sofiane Chellat (born 12 January 1990) is a French Algerian Rugby union player. His regular playing position is as Prop for Stade Français in the Top 14.

Playing career
Sofiane Chellat started as a pillar in the club AC Soissons, then joined the training center of Racing 92. During the 2013-2014 season, he goes to the Stade Rodez Aveyron in Fédérale 1. He is committed to 2014 at Stade Français, where he makes his professional debut in Top 14 and European Cup. After a season spent in the Ile-de-France club, he went to the US Montauban, which is playing in Pro D2 for the 2015–16 season. He makes his first appearance in Pro D2 in the club against Biarritz Olympique August 28, 2015.

Algeria
He honored his first international cape in Algeria on March 1, 2014 against the Ivory Coast team at Ernest Dufer Stadium (Toulouse). Then he participated in 2015 in the Crescent Cup organised by World Rugby and the Islamic Solidarity Sports Federation and in their first official match against Kazakhstan after this session Chellat did not return to the Algeria national team again. until 2018 in the Rugby Africa Silver Cup where he participated in three games and contributed to the rise of the Algerian team to the Rugby Africa Gold Cup for the first time with the major continent such as Kenya and Namibia.

International matches

Rugby statistics

Honours
French Top 14
Champions Stade Français: 2014–15

References

External links
Ligue Nationale De Rugby Profile
European Professional Club Rugby Profile
Stade Français Profile

Algerian rugby union players
Living people
French sportspeople of Algerian descent
People from Soissons
1990 births
French rugby union players
Rugby union props
Stade Français players
RC Massy players
Sportspeople from Aisne